Lawas may refer to:
Lawas
Lawas (federal constituency), represented in the Dewan Rakyat
Lawas (state constituency), formerly represented in the Sarawak State Legislative Assembly (1969–2006)